Bhandup Vidhan Sabha seat was one of the seats in Maharashtra Legislative Assembly in India. It was made defunct after constituency map of India was redrawn in 2008. Now there is a new constituency named Bhandup West which is a segment of Mumbai North East Lok Sabha seat.

Members of Vidhan Sabha

Election Results

1978 Assembly Election
 Sanzgiri, Prabhakar Pandurang (CPM) : 47,708 votes    
 Dina Bama Patil (INC) : 19,555

1980 Assembly Election
 Sherekar, Waman Ramchandra (INC-I) : 24,354 votes    
 Sanzgiri Prabhakar Pandurang (CPM) : 17,955

2004 Assembly Election
 Sanjay Dina Patil (NCP) : 79,440 votes  
 Dake Liladhar Balaji (SHS) : 73,760

See also 
 List of constituencies of Maharashtra Legislative Assembly

References 

Former assembly constituencies of Maharashtra